Tris(pentafluorophenyl)borane, sometimes referred to as "BCF", is the chemical compound .  It is a white, volatile solid.  The molecule consists of three pentafluorophenyl groups attached in a "paddle-wheel" manner to a central boron atom; the  core is planar. It has been described as the “ideal Lewis acid” because of its high thermal stability and the relative inertness of the B-C bonds. Related fluoro-substituted boron compounds, such as those containing  groups, decompose with formation of B-F bonds. Tris(pentafluorophenyl)borane is thermally stable at temperatures well over 200 °C, resistant to oxygen, and water-tolerant.

Preparation
Tris(pentafluorophenyl)borane is prepared using a Grignard reagent derived from bromopentafluorobenzene:
 

Structure
The structure of tris(pentafluorophenyl)borane (BCF) was determined by gas electron diffraction. It has a propeller-like arrangement of its three pentafluorophenyl groups with a torsional angle of 40.6(3)° for the deviation of these groups from a hypothetically planar arrangement.

Lewis acidity
The most noteworthy property of this molecule is its strong Lewis acidity. Its Lewis acid strength, as quantified by experimental equilibrium constants, is by 7 orders of magnitude higher than the one of structurally analogous triphenylborane. In consequence, even traces of moisture are able to deactivate  and remaining catalytic activity might only be due to the Brønsted acidity of the water adduct.

Applications in catalysis
In one application  forms noncoordinating anions by removing anionic ligands from metal centers. Illustrative is a reaction that give rise to alkene polymerization catalysts where tris(pentafluorophenyl)boron is used as an activator or cocatalyst:
 
In this process, the strongly coordinating methyl group transfers to the boron to expose a reactive site on zirconium. The resulting cationic zirconocene species is stabilised by the non coordinating borane anion. The exposed site on the zirconium allows for coordination of alkenes, whereupon migratory insertion into the remaining carbon-methyl ligand gives rise to a propyl ligand this process continues resulting in the growth of a polymer chain. This reagent has led to the development of immobilised catalyst/activator species; where the catalyst/activator is immobilised on an inert inorganic support such as silica. 

 is also capable of abstracting hydride to give , and it catalyzes hydrosilylation of aldehydes.  Otherwise  binds to a wide range of Lewis bases, even weak ones. The compound is hygroscopic, forming the trihydrate , wherein one water in coordinated to boron and the other two waters are hydrogen-bonded to the coordinated water.

Related compounds are  halides.

Frustrated Lewis pair
Tris(pentafluorophenyl)borane is a key reagent leading to the concept of frustrated Lewis pairs. The combination of BCF and bulky basic phosphines, such as tricyclohexylphosphine cleaves :
 
Many related phosphines, boranes, and substrates participate in related reactions.

Other reactions
 was used to prepare a compound containing a Xe-C bond:
 

 

 
This zwitterionic salt can be converted to a system that reversibly binds molecular :

References

Extra reading

Organoboranes
Pentafluorophenyl compounds
Perfluorinated compounds